Hoglinns Water is a small freshwater loch in the south of the island of Hoy, Orkney.  It drains in to Heldale Water via Hoglinns Burn. The loch was surveyed in 1906 by Sir John Murray and later charted as part of the Bathymetrical Survey of Fresh-Water Lochs of Scotland 1897-1909.

References

Freshwater lochs of Scotland
Lochs of Orkney
Hoy